Barbara Penny (1929 – 2007) was a British violinist.

She was the first woman to play in the strings section of the Royal Philharmonic Orchestra. She attended Malvern Girls' College and received a scholarship to the Royal College of Music.

In April, 2008, a Stradivarius violin owned by Penny since 1965 was auctioned by Christie's for $1.2 million.

External links
 'Penny' Stradivarius makes $1.2m at news.bbc.co.uk
 Penny Violin at allviolin.com
 Penny Violin at Christie's
  PDF, brief biography of Barbara Penny and history of her violin.

1929 births
2007 deaths
British classical violinists
People educated at Malvern St James
20th-century classical violinists
20th-century British musicians
Women classical violinists
20th-century women musicians